Dvuluchnoye is a rural locality (a selo) and the administrative center of Dvuluchenskoye Rural Settlement, Valuysky District, Belgorod Oblast, Russia. The population was 1,430 as of 2010. There are 25 streets.

Geography 
Dvuluchnoye is located 25 km southwest of Valuyki (the district's administrative centre) by road. Berezhanka is the nearest rural locality.

References 

Rural localities in Valuysky District